The 2017–18 Coastal Carolina Chanticleers women's basketball team represents Coastal Carolina University in the 2017–18 NCAA Division I women's basketball season. The Chanticleers, led by fifth year head coach Jaida Williams, play their home games at HTC Center and were members of the Sun Belt Conference. They finished the season 17–14, 10–8 in Sun Belt play to finish in a 3 way tie for sixth place. They advanced to the quarterfinals of the Sun Belt women's tournament where they lost to Texas State.

Previous season
They finished the season 13–16, 8–10 in Sun Belt play to finish in a tie for seventh place. They lost in the first round of the Sun Belt women's tournament to Appalachian State.

Roster

Schedule

|-
!colspan=9 style=| Non-conference regular season

|-
!colspan=9 style=| Sun Belt regular season

|-
!colspan=9 style=| Sun Belt Women's Tournament

See also
2017–18 Coastal Carolina Chanticleers men's basketball team

References

Coastal Carolina
Coastal Carolina Chanticleers women's basketball seasons